Amity is a hamlet in the town of Warwick, New York, United States. It is located between Edenville and Pine Island, near the New Jersey state line. Amity is served by the Amity Station of the Pine Island Fire Department. The Amity Presbyterian Society was founded  in 1796 and, after 213 years, celebrated its last service on April 26, 2009.  The church, located on Newport Bridge road near Amity Road, became home to Vision Community Church until December 2010.  Vision moved to the Park Avenue Elementary school in Warwick, NY after the Amity property was put up for sale..

References

Hamlets in New York (state)
Poughkeepsie–Newburgh–Middletown metropolitan area
Hamlets in Orange County, New York